Punishment Park is a 1971 American pseudo-documentary drama film written and directed by Peter Watkins. The setting is of a British and West German film crew following National Guard soldiers and police as they pursue members of a counterculture group across a desert.

Plot
The film takes place in 1970. The Vietnam War is escalating and United States President Richard Nixon has just decided on a "secret" bombing campaign in Cambodia. Faced with a growing anti-war movement, President Nixon decrees a state of emergency based on the McCarran Internal Security Act of 1950, which authorizes federal authorities, without reference to Congress, to detain persons judged to be a "risk to internal security".

Members from the anti-war movement, Civil Rights Movement, feminist movement, conscientious objectors, and Communist Party, mostly university students, are arrested and face an emergency tribunal made up of community members. With state and federal jails at their top capacity, the convicted face the option of spending their full conviction time in federal prison or three days at Punishment Park. There, they will have to traverse 53 miles of the hot California desert in three days, without water or food, while being chased by National Guardsmen and law enforcement officers as part of their field training. If they succeed and reach the American flag at the end of the course, they will be set free. If they fail by getting "arrested", they will serve the remainder of their sentence in federal prison.

European filmmakers follow two groups of detainees as part of their documentary; while Group 637 starts their three-day ordeal and learn the rules of the "game", the civilian tribunal begins hearings on Group 638. The filmmakers conduct interviews with members of Group 637 and their chasers, documenting how both sides become increasingly hostile towards the other. Meanwhile, the film crew documents the trial of Group 638 as they argue their case in vain for resisting the war in Vietnam. The first group splinters into one group that refuses to accept the rules of the game and tries to resist with violence, and another group that goes on towards the goal. The violent group are all killed. As the others come near the flag they find a group of police waiting for them; it turns out that there is no way to win the Punishment Park course as the system controls it from start to finish.

Cast
 Mark Keats ... Mr. Hoeger, President of the tribunal
 Gladys Golden ... Mrs. Jergens
 Sanford Golden ... Sen. Harris
 Sigmund Rich ... Prof. Hazlett
 George Gregory ... Mr. Keagan
 Katherine Quittner ... Nancy Smith
 Carmen Argenziano ... Jay Kaufman
 Mary Ellen Kleinhall ... Mary Ellen Mitchner
 Stanford Armstead ... Charles Robbins
 Patrick Boland ... accused
 Kent Foreman ... accused
 Luke Johnson ... accused
 Scott Turner ... accused
 Norman Sinclair ... member of the tribunal
 Paul Rosenstein ... member of the tribunal

Production
The film is an example of a uchronie, or alternate history, and of a psychodrama. It was shot in the cinéma vérité style using hand-held cameras. Watkins heightened realism by using amateur actors, improvisation, and newsreel camera techniques, but he also had rigid control over editing to guarantee audience involvement and the clear expression of his personal vision.

Initially Watkins had a carefully detailed script, but as in his other films, he decided to allow his cast to improvise based on their own instinctive reactions while following a rough outline of sequences drawn up by the director. In his previous films, Watkins had only used improvisation a small amount. Punishment Park was the first time Watkins gave his cast nearly complete control over the dialogue. On one occasion the participants identified with the situation so completely that the victims actually threw rocks at the pursuers, resulting in one opening fire in return. The panic of the film team, upon believing that the fallen actors had been shot for real, was genuine.

Although the film itself is fictional, many of the elements found within are metaphors of social and political events of the time, such as the trial of the Chicago Seven, the Kent State shootings, police brutality, and political polarisation.

Technical notes
Punishment Park was shot in 16mm with a skeleton crew of eight people and only one Eclair camera. The set was extremely minimal, using only a tent enclosed within a larger tent for the interior scenes. The rest was shot on location at the El Mirage Dry Lake in California. It took only two and a half weeks to shoot. The "newsreel" quality of the film was enhanced by desaturating the color and removing the traditional hard edge of the image through the use of Harrison diffusion filters. The total production cost was only $95,000, including a transfer from 16mm to 35mm.

Reception
One of Watkins' intentions for the film was to provoke strong emotional and intellectual responses. Few people had impartial reactions to the film. As Watkins foresaw, this produced debates after the viewings of the film similar to the debates that take place in the film. There were many extremely negative reactions to the film, largely due to the unconventional form or because it was viewed as an indictment against the United States. Some even linked the film to communism, claiming that the film expresses a Communist philosophy. However, many more people were outraged that a British director would make a film about American political problems in a time of crisis. The film was heavily attacked when it was released at the 1971 New York Film Festival and Hollywood studios refused to distribute it.

In spite of the controversy at the time of its release, the film has received a positive critical reappraisal in the years since. In 2005, The Guardian wrote that "twenty-five [sic] years on, Peter Watkins's dystopian nightmare still grips, imagining hippies and radicals getting tortured for quasi-judicial sport by the National Guard". As of 2022, it holds a 92% "Fresh" rating on Rotten Tomatoes.

References

External links
 
 
 
Notes on Punishment Park at Peter Watkins' website
Bob Fisher: A Conversation With Joan Churchill, ASC at Motion.kodak.com, retrieved 2012-06-15. (Contains some errors in details, i.e. budget.)

1971 films
1970s dystopian films
Anti-war films about the Vietnam War
Political mockumentaries
Films directed by Peter Watkins
Films set in 1970
Films set in California
Films set in deserts
Films about death games
1970s English-language films